Bazaar is an Indian Kannada action crime film directed by Suni and produced by Thimmegowda under Bharathi Film Productions banner. The film stars Dhanveer Gowda, a debutant and Aditi Prabhudeva in the lead roles along with Sadhu Kokila, Sharath Lohitashwa and Aruna Balaraj in the supporting roles. The film's plot deals with the gambling process involved in the pigeon racing. The film is shot in the real locations across Bengaluru, Mysore and Tumkur where the pigeon races are actually held.

The technical crew members for the film include Ravi Basrur as the music composer, Santhosh Rai Pathaje as the cinematographer, Abhishek. M as the editor. Initially planned to release on the Sankranthi festival day, the makers postponed the release to 1 February 2019.

Plot 
Kalki always dreams of being a pigeon racer. He falls in love with Pari. Pari works as a fashion designer hailing from a middle-class family. Kalki is from a gangster family. How does their life change when both fall head over heels with each other forms crux of the movie.

Cast 
 Dhanveer Gowda as Kalki
 Aditi Prabhudeva as Parijatha aka Pari
 Sharath Lohitashwa as Yajamana
 Sadhu Kokila as Jumanji
Chethan Chandra 
Silli lalli Anand 
Chitkala Biradar
 Aruna Balaraj as Kalki's adopted mother
 Manjunath Hegde ae Kalki's adopted father
 Sheelam M Swamy as Police
 Hampa Kumar Angadi as Hampa, a Pegion Racer
 Arjun A R as Dope
Kiran as Dope
Vishal Anvekar as Dope
Pradeep as Dope
Vatara Mallesh 
Vishwavijeth gowda as Dopu 
Raj Deepak Shetty as Shikhar

Soundtrack

Ravi Basrur has scored the soundtrack and score for the film. A total of three songs were composed by him. The audio was launched under the Ananda audio label by actor Darshan in Bengaluru.

Critical reception

Vinay Lokesh of The Times of India gave three out of five stars, praising score he stated, "Watch this movie to know about the world of pigeon racing which is laced with a love story, mass dialogues and action sequences".

References

External links 
 

2019 films
2019 crime action films
2010s Kannada-language films
Indian crime action films
2019 masala films
Indian gangster films
Films shot in Karnataka
Indian films about gambling
Films directed by Suni
Works about pigeon racing